The Most Beautiful Wife is a 1970 Italian film directed by Damiano Damiani, based on the 1965 case of Franca Viola, who challenged the still frequent southern Italian custom of kidnapping and raping a prospective bride by refusing to marry her abductor. It was the debut film for the then 14-year-old Ornella Muti.

Cast

 Ornella Muti as Francesca Cimarosa 
 Alessio Orano as  Vito Juvara
 Pierluigi Aprà as  Carabinieri Lieutenant
 Tano Cimarosa as  Gaetano Cimarosa 
 Joe Sentieri as  Poidomani
 Amerigo Tot as  Don Antonino Stella
 Enzo Andronico as Vito Juvara's Lawyer

References

External links 
 

1970 films
1970 drama films
Italian drama films
1970s Italian-language films
Films set in Sicily
Films directed by Damiano Damiani
Films scored by Ennio Morricone
Drama films based on actual events
1970s Italian films
Violence against women in Italy